Anthony Terran (May 30, 1926 – March 20, 2017) was an American trumpet player and session musician. He was part of the Wrecking Crew, a group of largely uncredited session musicians in Los Angeles, California, who helped famous artists record hit records in the 1960s.

Career
Terran was in high school when he started working on live radio shows in Buffalo, New York. In 1944, he arrived in Los Angeles after touring with Horace Heidt. In 1945, he began working with Bob Hope, and then with Desi Arnaz in 1946. Terran was the last surviving member of the Desi Arnaz Orchestra from the I Love Lucy television show.

Terran performed and recorded with many artists including the Jackson 5, the 5th Dimension, the Mamas & the Papas, the Beach Boys, Harry Nilsson, the Bee Gees, Ray Charles, Neil Diamond, Chicago, Nat King Cole, Natalie Cole, Commodores, Perry Como, Bob Dylan, Ella Fitzgerald, Benny Goodman, Tony Bennett, Eartha Kitt, Peggy Lee, Madonna (I'm Breathless), Dean Martin, Elvis Presley, Bonnie Raitt (Takin' My Time), Linda Ronstadt, Diana Ross, Frank Sinatra, Sammy Davis Jr., Lou Rawls, Barbra Streisand, Baja Marimba Band, Tijuana Brass, the Carpenters, Tom Waits, Ricky Nelson and Eric Burdon and the Animals.

Terran played on many recordings of television shows and film soundtracks such as I Love Lucy, The Lucy Show, Here's Lucy, The Brady Bunch, I Dream of Jeannie, Columbo, Get Smart, Happy Days, Popeye, The Carol Burnett Show, Star Trek, The Love Boat, Mission Impossible, Cheers, L.A. Law, The Simpsons, M*A*S*H, The Odd Couple, Mork and Mindy, Rocky I, II and III, The Karate Kid I, II and III, The Natural, All the President's Men, Broadcast News, Field of Dreams, Blazing Saddles, Grease, An Officer and a Gentleman, The Exorcist, Ghostbusters, Dirty Dancing, Three Amigos, Forrest Gump, Taps, Close Encounters of the Third Kind and The Deep.

He was also a featured soloist for composers and conductors including Benny Goodman, Nelson Riddle, John Williams, Patrick Williams, David Shire, Lalo Schifrin, Bill Conti, Elmer Bernstein, Jerry Goldsmith, Henry Mancini, Johnny Mandel, James Horner, Charles Fox, Burt Bacharach and John Barry. Terran received the Most Valuable Player award from the National Academy of Recording Arts and Sciences in 1974.

Family
Terran had one marriage from 1963–1976 to singer and dancer Avalon Adele Kirkham. They had four children.

Mentor
Terran was known for mentoring new trumpet players and providing opportunities for watching his recording sessions and learning the business. Chris Tedesco, cousin to Tommy Tedesco, was one of the trumpet players who owe their beginning as a Hollywood session artist to Terran’s mentorship.

Selected discography

As featured artist
The Song's Been Sung (Imperial, 1966)

As sideman
with Chet Baker
Blood, Chet and Tears (Verve, 1970)

with the Henri René Orchestra
RCA Victor Presents Eartha Kitt (RCA, 1953)
That Bad Eartha (EP) (RCA, 1954)
Down To Eartha (RCA, 1955)
That Bad Eartha (LP) (RCA, 1956)
Thursday's Child (RCA, 1957)

with Lalo Schifrin
 Music from Mission: Impossible (Dot, 1967)
 There's a Whole Lalo Schifrin Goin' On (Dot, 1968)
 Bullitt (soundtrack) (Warner Bros., 1968)
 Enter the Dragon (soundtrack) (Warner Bros., 1973)

Notes

References

External links
 
 Young and Terran photo
 
 
 
 

1926 births
2017 deaths
Musicians from Los Angeles
Musicians from Buffalo, New York
American session musicians
The Wrecking Crew (music) members
American jazz trumpeters
American male trumpeters
Jazz musicians from New York (state)
Jazz musicians from California
American male jazz musicians